John Leander Billard (July 18, 1842 - December 18, 1924) was a coal merchant. He initiated a hostile takeover of the Boston and Maine Railroad in 1914.

Biography 
He was born on July 18, 1842, in Saybrook, Connecticut, to John Denton Billard and Emeline E. Spencer. He attended Yale University. He married Harriet Yale Merriman on May 26, 1868 and they had a son, Frederick Howell Billard (1873-1906). In 1914 he attempted a hostile takeover of the Boston and Maine Railroad.

He died on December 18, 1924.

Footnotes

External links
 

1842 births
1924 deaths
Boston and Maine Railroad
Yale University alumni
People from Deep River, Connecticut
Businesspeople from Connecticut